Midtown Phillips is a neighborhood within the Phillips community in Minneapolis. Its boundaries are East 24th Street to the north, Bloomington Avenue to the east, East Lake Street to the south, and Chicago Avenue to the west.

The community is primarily residential by land use and is home to over 4,700 residents from diverse backgrounds according to the 2010 Census. Prominent employers include the Children's Hospital of Minnesota Minneapolis location, Abbot Northwestern Hospital, and Allina Healthcare Services. There are approximately 11,800 people who work in Midtown Phillips according to the 2010 Census. Cultural institutions include the Midtown Global Market, Saint Paul's Church, Abubakar As-Sadique Islamic Center, and the Heart of the Beast Theater.

The $189 million redevelopment of the vacant Sears building at Chicago Avenue and Lake Street into a mixed-used development of offices, hotel, retail and housing located in Midtown Phillips is one of the most important projects undertaken in Minneapolis in recent times.

Stewart Park and Andersen United School are located in the core of Midtown Phillips. According to niche.com, Andersen School has 1,086 students in grades PK and K-8. According to state standards, 28% of students at this school are considered proficient in math and/or reading. According to the McKnight Foundation website, Andersen United School has a student body which is 95% low income, and/or students of color, and/or bilingual.

Health institutions in Midtown Phillips include Abbott Northwestern Hospital, Children's Hospital of Minnesota, Allina Health, and numerous private practices. Chicago Avenue, which borders the west end of Midtown Phillips, was proclaimed a wellness corridor by the Minneapolis adapted corridor plan titled the Chicago Avenue Corridor Plan. http://www.ci.minneapolis.mn.us/cped/planning/cped_cacp

References

External links
Midtown Phillips Neighborhood Association

Neighborhoods in Minneapolis